C. Shanmugam is an Indian politician and was a Member of the Legislative Assembly (MLA) of Tamil Nadu. He was elected to the Tamil Nadu legislative assembly as a Dravida Munnetra Kazhagam (DMK) candidate from Alandur constituency in the 1989 and 1996 elections.

Shanmugam - together with his wife and son - was among several DMK legislators charged by Tamil Nadu Police in June 2005 of having assets disproportionate to their known income.

References 

Living people
Dravida Munnetra Kazhagam politicians
Tamil Nadu MLAs 1996–2001
Tamil Nadu MLAs 1989–1991
Year of birth missing (living people)